Kitscoty is a village located in central Alberta, Canada. Situated at the junction of Highway 16 (Yellowhead Highway) and Highway 897 (the link to Cold Lake), the village is located approximately midway between Edmonton and Saskatoon ( and  respectively). In addition, the village is within short commuting distance of Lloydminster. The CN railway tracks also pass through Kitscoty. The municipal office of the surrounding County of Vermilion River's is located in Kitscoty.

Kitscoty is located in rich agricultural area which has much heavy oil activity, both of which provide employment opportunities for the residents.

History 

The first settlers came to the district in 1905, and was incorporated as a village in 1911. Kitscoty originally served a trading area stretching from Cold Lake in the north to the Battle River in the south. Kitscoty is named after a famous cromlech, 3 large stones in a tripod arrangement, found near a settlement in England known as Kit's Coty House.

Demographics 

In the 2016 Census of Population conducted by Statistics Canada, the Village of Kitscoty recorded a population of 925 living in 317 of its 337 total private dwellings, a  change from its 2011 population of 846.

The population of the Village of Kitscoty according to its 2016 municipal census is 976, a  change from its 2013 municipal census population of 967.

Education 

There is an elementary school and a junior/senior high school within the village.

See also 
List of communities in Alberta
List of villages in Alberta

References

External links 

1911 establishments in Alberta
Villages in Alberta